The Hailar–Zhangjiakou Expressway, designated as G1013 and commonly referred to as the Haizhang Expressway, is an expressway in China that connects the cities of Hulunbuir, Inner Mongolia, and Zhangjiakou, Hebei. The expressway is a spur of the G10 Suifenhe–Manzhouli Expressway.

As of 2022, the Hailar-Xilinhot section is under planning, and the Xilinhot-Zhangjiakou section has been completed and opened. This opening section was originally called the Xizhang Expressway.

References

Chinese national-level expressways
Expressways in Hebei
Expressways in Inner Mongolia